Joseph Will Oldham (born January 15, 1970) is an American singer-songwriter and actor. From 1993 to 1997, he performed and recorded in collaboration with dozens of other musicians under variations of Palace (Palace, Palace Brothers, Palace Songs, and Palace Music). After briefly publishing music under his own name, in 1998 he adopted Bonnie "Prince" Billy as the name for most of his work.

Early life and education
Oldham was born on January 15, 1970, in Louisville, Kentucky. His mother, Joanne Lei Will Tafel Oldham, was a teacher and artist. His father, Joseph Collins Oldham, was an attorney and photographer. Oldham graduated from the J. Graham Brown School in 1988. He attended Brown University sporadically while pursuing a career as an actor, and living between Brooklyn, Los Angeles, and Bloomington, Indiana. He began making music during this time, initially as a project for his professor Jeff Todd Titon, an ethnomusicologist at Brown University.

Career 

Oldham is known for his "do-it-yourself punk aesthetic and blunt honesty", and his music has been likened to Americana, folk, roots, country, punk, and indie rock. He has been called an "Appalachian post-punk solipsist", with a voice that has been described as "a fragile sort-of warble frittering around haunted melodies in the American folk or country tradition."

Oldham first performed and recorded under various permutations of the Palace name, including Palace Brothers, Palace Songs, Palace Music, and simply Palace. Regarding the name changes during this period (1993–1997), Oldham said:

Will stated in a 1995 interview with KCRW that the name Palace Flophouse was inspired by reading John Steinbeck's Cannery Row. Beginning in 1998, Oldham has primarily used the moniker Bonnie 'Prince' Billy, which draws inspiration from several sources:

He has explained that "the primary purpose of the pseudonym is to allow both the audience and the performer to have a relationship with the performer that is valid and unbreakable."

Critical reception
Some of his albums, such as There Is No-One What Will Take Care of You (1993), Viva Last Blues (1995), and I See a Darkness (1999), have appeared on greatest albums lists.
 
Johnny Cash recorded a version of "I See a Darkness" on his American Recordings disc American III: Solitary Man (2000). Oldham provided backing vocals. Marianne Faithfull included Oldham's "A King at Night" on her 2003 Kissin Time tour. Steve Adey also covered "I See a Darkness" on his 2006 LP All Things Real. Mark Kozelek recorded a version of Oldham's "New Partner" on his 2008 disc, The Finally LP. Katatonia covered "Oh How I Enjoy the Light" on their 2001 EP Tonight's Music. In 2009 Mark Lanegan and Soulsavers recorded a cover version of "You Will Miss Me When I Burn". The release is a split single, backed with the Lanegan-penned "Sunrise" featuring vocals by Oldham. In 2011, Deer Tick's cover of Oldham's song "Death to Everyone" appeared in an episode of Hell On Wheels. Cadaverous Condition covered "Black" on their To the Night Sky album (2006).

Acting

Film and television
Oldham's first film acting role was as the teen preacher in John Sayles's film Matewan (1987), a dramatization of the life of Appalachian mining community in the 1920s and the Battle of Matewan. Following this, he moved to Hollywood to pursue a career as an actor. He played the role of Chip McClure (father of Baby Jessica) in Everybody's Baby: The Rescue of Jessica McClure (1989), and the role of Miles in the film Thousand Pieces of Gold (1991). Oldham also played minor roles in Julien Donkey-Boy (1999), Junebug (2005), and The Guatemalan Handshake (2006).

In 2004, Oldham appeared as himself in the short documentary film Tripping With Caveh, wherein he took psilocybin mushrooms with autobiographical filmmaker Caveh Zahedi. The project was intended as the pilot episode of a reality/documentary series, with the concept being that Zahedi would take psychedelics in the company of a different celebrity in each episode. The project was never picked up by a television network, but the short with Oldham finally saw official release in the 2015 retrospective box set Digging My Own Grave: The Films of Caveh Zahedi.

Oldham played a lead role as Kurt in Kelly Reichardt's film Old Joy (2006), and had a brief role in the director's next film Wendy and Lucy (2008). Oldham played Pastor Pigmeat in the "Horse Apples" episode of the second season of the MTV children's show parody Wonder Showzen and appeared in an episode of Chatman and Lee's subsequent television show, Xavier: Renegade Angel as a Reverend. In 2007, he starred alongside Zach Galifianakis in a music video for Kanye West's "Can't Tell Me Nothing".

Also in 2010, Oldham appeared in Jackass 3D as a gorilla trainer. As part of an agreement to play that role, he wrote a theme song, in the style of a Saturday-morning cartoon show, for filmmaker Lance Bangs.

In 2017, Oldham appeared as "Prognosticator" in the feature film A Ghost Story, directed by David Lowery.

Voice work
In 2009, Oldham narrated Madam and Little Boy, a documentary film about atomic weapons, directed by Swedish artist Magnus Bärtås. In 2010, Oldham narrated Music Makes a City, a documentary about the formation of the Louisville Orchestra, directed by Owsley Brown III and Jerome Hiler.  Oldham provided voice work and inspiration for the character "Will" in the video game Kentucky Route Zero, released in 2013.

Personal life 
He married the textile artist Elsa Hansen Oldham in 2016. They had a child together in 2018.

Discography

Studio albums 
 There Is No-One What Will Take Care of You – Palace Brothers (1993)
 Days in the Wake – Palace Brothers (1994)
 Viva Last Blues – Palace Music (1995)
 Arise Therefore – Palace Music (1996)
 Joya – Will Oldham (1997)
 I See a Darkness – Bonnie "Prince" Billy (1999)
 Ease Down the Road – Bonnie "Prince" Billy (2001)
 Master and Everyone – Bonnie "Prince" Billy (2003)
 Sings Greatest Palace Music – Bonnie "Prince" Billy (2004) (reworkings of earlier songs) 
 Superwolf – Matt Sweeney & Bonnie "Prince" Billy (2005)
 The Brave and the Bold – Tortoise & Bonnie "Prince" Billy (2006) (covers album) 
 The Letting Go – Bonnie "Prince" Billy (2006)
 Lie Down in the Light – Bonnie "Prince" Billy (2008)
 Beware – Bonnie "Prince" Billy (2009)
 The Wonder Show of the World – Bonnie "Prince" Billy and the Cairo Gang (2010)
 Wolfroy Goes to Town – Bonnie "Prince" Billy (2011)
 Bonnie "Prince" Billy – Bonnie "Prince" Billy (2013) (EP) 
 Singer's Grave – A Sea of Tongues – Bonnie "Prince" Billy (2014) (reworkings of songs from Wolfroy Goes to Town)
 Epic Jammers and Fortunate Little Ditties – Bitchin Bajas and Bonnie Prince Billy (2016)
 Best Troubador – Bonnie "Prince" Billy (2017) (covers of Merle Haggard songs)
 Wolf of the Cosmos – Bonnie "Prince" Billy (2017) (cover of Sonata Mix Dwarf Cosmos by Susanna)
 Songs of Love and Horror – Will Oldham (2018) (reworkings of earlier songs)
 I Made a Place – Bonnie "Prince" Billy (2019)
 Superwolves – Matt Sweeney & Bonnie "Prince" Billy (2021)
 Blind Date Party – Bill Callahan & Bonnie "Prince" Billy (2022)

Filmography

Film

Television

References

External links

 Bonnie "Prince" Billy official website
 https://royalstable.nl fan-site with expanded discography and news section
  (includes links to alias profiles/discographies)
 Will Oldham at Drag City (record label)
 Bonnie "Prince" Billy at Domino Records (record label)
 
 
 "I don't care, let's have some tea: A conversation with Bonnie "Prince" Billy" by Colin Cheney, 2004
 "The Pretender: Will Oldham transfigures American music" by Kelefa Sanneh in The New Yorker, 2009
 Interview with Oldham at Music Illuminati, 2010

1970 births
American alternative country singers
American country guitarists
American country singer-songwriters
American folk guitarists
American male singer-songwriters
American male guitarists
American folk singers
Brown University alumni
Drag City (record label) artists
Domino Recording Company artists
Gothic country musicians
Living people
Musicians from Louisville, Kentucky
Country musicians from Kentucky
Singer-songwriters from Kentucky
Folk musicians from Kentucky
J. Graham Brown School alumni
Guitarists from Kentucky
Silver Jews members
Boxhead Ensemble members
21st-century American singers
21st-century American guitarists
21st-century American male singers
Western Vinyl artists
 
Record Collection artists